John Rufus Edie (January 14, 1814 – August 27, 1888) was an Opposition Party and Republican member of the U.S. House of Representatives from Pennsylvania and a United States Army officer in the American Civil War.

Early life
John Rufus Edie was born in Gettysburg, Pennsylvania in 1814. He attended the public schools and then Emmitsburg College in Emmitsburg, Maryland. He served as principal of the Gettysburg schools for several years. Edie studied law, was admitted to the bar in 1840 and commenced practice in Somerset, Pennsylvania. His son, John R. Edie Junior, was an 1861 graduate of the United States Military Academy at West Point, New York.

Political activities
Edie served as a member of the Pennsylvania State Senate in 1845 and 1846. He was appointed deputy attorney general in 1847 and served until 1850; afterwards serving as district attorney from 1850 to 1854.

He was elected as an Opposition Party candidate to the Thirty-fourth Congress and reelected as a Republican to the Thirty-fifth Congress. He was not a candidate for renomination in 1858.

Civil War service
Edie was commissioned a major of the 15th Infantry Regiment on May 14, 1861; and commanded its field detachment that served in the western theater. He frequently served as commander of the Regular Brigade in the XIV Corps of the Army of the Cumberland. He was promoted to lieutenant colonel of the 8th Infantry Regiment in September 1864 and brevetted colonel the same month. He served until January 1871, when he was honorably discharged. Colonel Edie then resumed the practice of law in Somerset and died there in 1888, being interred in the local Union Cemetery.

References

Sources
 Retrieved on 2008-02-14
The Political Graveyard

External links

1814 births
1888 deaths
People from Gettysburg, Pennsylvania
Opposition Party members of the United States House of Representatives from Pennsylvania
Republican Party members of the United States House of Representatives from Pennsylvania
Republican Party Pennsylvania state senators
Union Army colonels
Pennsylvania lawyers
United States Military Academy alumni
19th-century American politicians
19th-century American lawyers
Military personnel from Pennsylvania